Segura de Toro is a Spanish village in the north of the province of Cáceres. There are some Celtic remains which can indicate a possible Celtic origin. It is situated by the Tras la Sierra mountains at an altitude of 715 m.  It has several streams, and the main one being Garganta Ancha. The village has a Mediterranean climate and its pluviosity is 986.4 m/m. It's built on a granite formation and there are chestnuts and oaks surrounded by tree heaths and genista.

Demography
24.3% of the population is elderly. The population peaked in 1951. There were 193 inhabitants as of 2005.

References

External links
 Segura de Toro

Municipalities in the Province of Cáceres